Sophie Caroline Pataky, real name Stipek (5 April 1860 – 24 January 1915) was an Austrian bibliographer. With her two-volume Lexikon deutscher Frauen der Feder (Dictionary of German Women of the Pen), the first German-language encyclopaedia of women writers edited by a woman was published in 1898.

Life 
Born in Podiebrad, Austrian Empire, Pataky was married to the engineer and patent attorney Carl Pataky (1844-1914). He had founded a specialist publishing house for metal technology in Vienna in 1875, in which Pataky collaborated. Otherwise she was a housewife and completely absorbed with "family duties." The couple had lived in Berlin since the late 1870s or early 1880s. Pataky was uninterested in the feminist movement, but attended the International Women's Congress at the Berlin Town Hall in the summer of 1896. As a result, she became interested in women's issues and began researching literature by and for women; the only existing encyclopaedia of her century she noted was Carl Wilhelm Otto August von Schindel's work Die deutschen Schriftstellerinnen des neunzehnten Jahrhunderts, which, however, had already been published in the 1820s. The lack of a sequel or another comprehensive work or encyclopaedia on nineteenth-century women writers prompted Pataky to contact women writers herself, collect biographies of women writers since 1840 and eventually publish them in the two-volume work Lexikon deutscher Frauen der Feder. Both volumes were published in 1898 after almost two years of work by the publishing house of Carl Pataky, who, however, specialised in metal technology. Therefore, the encyclopaedia was already taken over by the publishing house Schuster & Loeffler in 1899.

Pataky originally planned to publish the books under the title Lexikon deutscher Schriftstellerinnen (Encyclopaedia of German Women Writers), but changed the title when numerous women writers refused to contribute because they did not see themselves as writers. Pataky's aim was "to present women writers in general, regardless of the form in which they express their intellectual activity with the pen", to be recorded in the book. In total, Pataky placed around 6000 Women authors presented, with a large number represented exclusively by their address. By including cookbook authors, journalists, editors among others, she provided a more comprehensive picture of women writers than, for example, Franz Brümmer, who published at the same time.

Around 1898, Pataky was a board member of the German Women Writers' Association. At this time, starting from her encyclopaedia project, she began to compile a library of works by German-speaking women authors. She had the authors presented in Deutsche Frauen der Feder send her their own works, which were then collected in the Bibliothek deutscher Frauenwerke. By 1898, Pataky had already collected over 1000 books. In this context, a dispute with the author  has survived, who accused Pataky of wanting to enrich himself with the books. Der Briefwechsel mit Krane ist zusammen mit einigen wenigen Manuskripten des Projektes im Archiv der deutschen Frauenbewegung in Kassel überliefert.

In the same year, Carl Pataky took K. J. Müller into his publishing house as a silent partner. Müller took over the publishing house after Carl Pataky's death - he died on 11 August 1914 during a holiday in Bad Reichenhall - from September 1914. Sophie Pataky died of a cerebral stroke at her home in Untermais on 24 January 1915 and was buried in the local Catholic cemetery on 26 January 1915. In her will she bequeathed 20,000 crowns to the Municipal Sanatorium in Merano and the Maiser Versorgungshaus 10,000 Kronen. Data on further book projects are not known.

Publications 
 Lexikon deutscher Frauen der Feder. Eine Zusammenstellung der seit dem Jahre 1840 erschienenen Werke weiblicher Autoren, nebst Biographieen der lebenden und einem Verzeichnis der Pseudonyme. Herausgegeben von Sophie Pataky. Carl Pataky, Berlin 1898
 1. vol: A–L
 2. vol: M–Z

Numerized:
 Scan bei literature.at: Band 1, Vol. 2
 Scan von Google Books im Internet Archive: Vol. 1, Band 2
 E-Text bei zeno.org: Startseite

References

External links 
 
 Susanne Kinnebrock: Journalismus als Frauenberuf anno 1900. 2008  Inhaltsanalyse des Lexikons Frauen der Feder (PDF; 450 kB), retrieved 16 September 2021
 Findbuch zum Nachlass von Sophie Pataky kept by 

Women lexicographers
Austrian bibliographers
1860 births
1915 deaths
People from Poděbrady